Escape: The True Story of the Only Westerner Ever to Break out of Thailand's Bangkok Hilton is a 2007 book by career smuggler David McMillan describing his time and escape from Klong Prem Central Prison in Bangkok, Thailand.

See also
 List of helicopter prison escapes

Non-fiction crime books
2007 non-fiction books
2008 non-fiction books
Memoirs of imprisonment